This list comprises all players who have participated in at least one league match for New England Revolution since the team's first Major League Soccer season in 1996. Players who were on the roster but never played a first team game are not listed; players who appeared for the team in other competitions (US Open Cup, CONCACAF Champions League, etc.) but never actually made an MLS appearance are noted at the bottom of the page.

A "†" denotes players who only appeared in a single match.

A
  José Manuel Abundis
  Juan Agudelo
  Chris Albright
  Yari Allnutt
  Kevin Alston
  Damián Álvarez
  Leonel Álvarez
  Shaker Asad
  Stephane Assengue
  Geoff Aunger

B
  Imad Baba
  Gabriel Badilla
  Chris Bagley
  Jeff Baicher
  Richie Baker
  Darrius Barnes
  Chad Barrett
  Jamar Beasley
  Jerry Bengtson
  Zak Boggs
  Blake Brettschneider
  Félix Brillant
  Adin Brown
  Chris Brown
  Kyle Brown
  Teal Bunbury
  Mike Burns
  Preston Burpo
  Bryan Byrne †

C
  Scott Caldwell
  Dan Calichman
  Geoffrey Castillion †
  José Cancela
  Milton Caraglio
  Fernando Cárdenas
  Cássio
  Mauricio Castro
  Catê
  Jeff Causey
  Alex Pineda Chacón
  Ted Chronopoulos
  Kalifa Cissé
  Braeden Cloutier
  Ryan Cochrane
  Nico Colaluca
  Chiquinho Conde
  Franco Coria
  Scott Coufal
  Adam Cristman
  Leo Cullen

D
  Chaka Daley
  Ousmane Dabo
  Damien
  Charlie Davies
  John DeBrito
  Clint Dempsey
  Mamadou Diallo
  Raúl Díaz Arce
  Didier Domi
  Andy Dorman
  Paulo Dos Santos
  Nick Downing
  Bilal Duckett †
  Kheli Dube
  Brian Dunseth

E
  Connally Edozien
  Adam Eyre

F
  Dario Fabbro
  Diego Fagundez
  Alejandro Farías
  Keith Flynn 
  Andrew Farrell
  Benny Feilhaber
  Argenis Fernández
  José Carlos Fernández
  Ian Feuer
  Gary Flood
  Joe Franchino
  Iain Fraser
  Ian Fuller

G
  Giuseppe Galderisi
  Jani Galik
  Blair Gavin
  Sam George
  Joe Germanese †
  Cory Gibbs
  José Gonçalves
  Mario Gori
  Edwin Gorter
  Richard Goulooze
  Ariel Graziani
  Jason Griffiths
  Winston Griffiths
  Ryan Guy

H
  Jeremy Hall
  John Harkes
  Wolde Harris
  Bill Harte
  Aidan Heaney
  Wayne Henshaw
  Jay Heaps
  Zachary Herivaux
  Kevin O'Harte
  Daniel Hernández
  Chase Hilgenbrinck
  Michael Hobson
  Femi Hollinger-Janzen
  Jamie Holmes †
  Steve Howey
  Eduardo Hurtado

I
  Zak Ibsen
  Amaechi Igwe
  Dimitry Imbongo
  Erik Imler

J
  Jair
  Edgaras Jankauskas
  Avery John
  Jermaine Jones
  Shalrie Joseph

K
  Kei Kamara
  Brian Kamler
  Daouda Kanté
  Ibrahim Kante
  Paul Keegan
  Kris Kelderman
  John Kerr, Jr.
  Ryan Kinne †
  Steve Klein
  Brad Knighton
  Daigo Kobayashi
  Gershon Koffie
  Xavier Kouassi
  Tony Kuhn

L
  Alexi Lalas
  Greg Lalas
  Jeff Larentowicz
  Ryan Latham
  Florian Lechner
  Rajko Lekić
  Marshall Leonard
  Roberto Linck
  Tom Lips
  Carlos Llamosa
  Tony Lochhead
  John Lozano

M
  Kenny Mansally
  Brandon Manzonelli † 
  Stephen McCarthy
  Ivan McKinley
  Tom McLaughlin †
  Victor Mella
  Janusz Michallik
  Dahir Mohammed
  Jason Moore
  Joe-Max Moore
  José Luis Morales
  José Moreno
  Manny Motajo
  Patrick Mullins

N
  David Nakhid
  Beto Naveda
  Steve Neumann
  Lee Nguyen
  Joseph Niouky
  Pat Noonan
  Sainey Nyassi

O
  Arsène Oka †
  Francis Okaroh
  Matt Okoh
  Sean Okoli
  Patrick Olalere †
  Emmanuel Osei

P
  Óscar Pareja
  Michael Parkhurst
  Carlos Parra
  Marko Perović
  Pat Phelan
  Ricardo Phillips
  Rusty Pierce
  Tyler Polak
  Alec Purdie

R
  Steve Ralston
  Mauricio Ramos
  Matt Reis
  James Riley
  Michael Roach
  Carlos Rocha
  Jim Rooney
  Kelyn Rowe
  Björn Runström

S
  Sambinha
  Giovanni Savarese
  Darren Sawatzky
  Zack Schilawski
  Carlos Semedo
  Saër Sène
  Diego Serna
  Bobby Shuttleworth
  Clyde Simms
  Willie Sims
  Kyle Singer
  Seth Sinovic
  Donnie Smith
  Khano Smith
  A. J. Soares
  Juergen Sommer
  Leonardo Squadrone
  Jim St. Andre
  Ilija Stolica
  William Sunsing

T
  Patrick Tardieu
  Tony Taylor †
  Wells Thompson
  Chris Tierney
  Juan Toja
  Johnny Torres
  Taylor Twellman

U
  Robert Ukrop

V
  Jesse Van Saun
  Roland Vargas-Aguilera †
  Jorge Vazquez
  Luke Vercollone
  Michael Videira
  Bojan Vučković †

W
  Doug Warren
  Je-Vaughn Watson
  Mark Watson
  Richard Weiszmann
  Wélton
  Jeremiah White
  Andy Williams
  John Wilson †
  Evans Wise
  John Wolyniec †
  London Woodberry
  Peter Woodring
  Alan Woods
  Mauricio Wright
  Kevin Wylie
  Eric Wynalda
  Danny Wynn

Z
  Walter Zenga
  Monsef Zerka
  Fabio Zúñiga

Sources
 

New England Revolution
 
Association football player non-biographical articles